Baharan (also Romanized as Bahārān; also known as Gaburān and Kabūrān) is a village in Bazarjan Rural District, in the Central District of Tafresh County, Markazi Province, Iran. At the 2006 census, its population was 147, in 49 families.

References 

Populated places in Tafresh County